The 2014 Uzbekistan First League was the 23rd season of 2nd level football in Uzbekistan since independence in 1992. It is split in an Eastern and Western zone, each featuring 12 teams.

Teams and locations

Competition format
League consists of two regional groups: conference "East" and "West". The season comprises two phases. The first phase consists of a regular home-and-away schedule: each team plays the other teams twice. 
The top eight teams of the first phase from each zone will be merged in one tournament and compete for the championship.  The bottom four teams of each zone after first phase will play relegation matches to remain in first league.

The draw of the 2014 season was held on 21 February 2014. First League joined Shurtan Guzar, Guliston, Obod Tashkent, Mash'al-2, FK Gijduvan.

Sherdor-Presstizh changed its name to Sherdor (Samarkand).

First phase
Final standings after finishing first phase of championship

Zone "East"

Top goalscorers

Zone "West"

Top goalscorers

Second phase

Championship round

Table before start
League table before start of second phase of championship.

Final standings
The last matchday matches were played on 29 October 2014.

Last updated: 29 October 2014
Source: Soccerway

Top goalscorers

Relegation round
The teams ranked 9-12th place in first phase of championship played against each other in one leg group competition to define teams which play in relegation play-offs. The relegation round matches took place from 20-26 October 2014.

Final standings

Relegation play-offs
The one leg relegation matches of 15th and 16th placed teams of championship round (Ghallakor-Avtomobilchi, Sherdor-Presstizh) against two last placed teams of relegation round (Bunyodkor-2, Lokomotiv BFK) were played on 4 November 2014. Bunyodkor-2 and Lokomotiv BFK remained in First League for 2015 season.

Matches

|}

References

External links 
PFL - First league results 
Uzbekistan First League 2014 - soccerway

Uzbekistan Pro League seasons
2
Uzbek
Uzbek